Četverored is 1999 Croatian film directed by Jakov Sedlar. Based on the novel of the same name by Ivan Aralica, the plot of the film deals with the Yugoslav death march of Nazi collaborators. It was the first film to deal with the subject, formerly a taboo topic under the Communist government. Četverored was aired on television only a week after its theatrical release in Zagreb, in what was widely characterised as an electoral ploy to support the ruling Croatian Democratic Union, which subsequently lost the elections.

Četverored was the last film role of Ena Begović before her death in a car accident in August 2000.

Cast
The cast also includes Luka Peroš best known for his role of Marseille in Money Heist.

 Ivan Marević as Ivan Telebar
 Ena Begović as Mirta Mešog
 Goran Navojec as Baja Mešog
 Nadežda Perišić-Nola as Marguerita
 Zvonimir Zoričić as Zlatko Trlin
 Nada Abrus as Malvina
 Boris Buzančić as Senjak
 Mia Oremović as Gost
 Filip Šovagović as poručnik Hunjeta
 Tamara Garbajs as Magdalena
 Zoran Čubrilo as "Crnac" na motoru
 Vera Zima as nadstojnica časne službe
 Dejan Aćimović as Šaban
 Hrvoje Klobučar as tupi domobran
 Ante Čedo Martinić as Ante Moškov

Critical reception
The Croatian Cinema Database website's entry for the movie gives the film a largely negative review, noting that screenwriter Ivan Aralica and director Jakov Sedlar "turned the film into an expression of caricatured intolerance towards (Serbian and Montenegrin) partisans" and that its "hate speech and utter nonsense" overshadows any potential it has.

Historian Jelena Batinić writes that, despite the film's high production value and prominent Croatian actors, it "rarely rises above the level of a propaganda pamphlet with crude ethnic stereotyping" as the mostly Serb Partisans are portrayed as vicious murderers and Croat prisoners as innocent victims.

Professor Dijana Jelača of Brooklyn College lists Četverored as among the post-Yugoslav nationalist revisionist films which use events of the past, reconstructing them in order to "warn generations to come" of the never-ending threats to nationhood. In this case, communism is presented as being on equal footing, if not worse, than fascism. Film scholar Dino Murtic describes the film as "perhaps the most inglorious example of the cinema of self-victimisation" made during the 1990s as Yugoslavia had disintegrated.

References

External links
 

1999 films
Croatian World War II films
1990s war drama films
Films directed by Jakov Sedlar
Films based on Croatian novels
Croatian war drama films
1999 drama films
Films set in 1945